Duchess is a village in southern Alberta, Canada that is surrounded by the County of Newell. It is north of Brooks and the Trans-Canada Highway.

The village was named for Duchess Louise Marguerite. It is mainly a ranching community.

Demographics 

In the 2016 Census of Population conducted by Statistics Canada, the Village of Duchess recorded a population of 1,085 living in 371 of its 390 total private dwellings, a  change from its 2011 population of 992.

Notable people 
Jeff Shantz, professional hockey player
Cheryl Bartlett, biologist
Jaxon Riste, CMRU broadcaster  and online music personality.

See also 
List of communities in Alberta
List of villages in Alberta

References

External links 

 

1921 establishments in Alberta
Villages in Alberta
Populated places established in 1921